The E. bipunctella invalidly described in 1936 by H. Rebel in L. Osthelder is actually E. distigmatella.

Ethmia bipunctella is a diurnal moth from the family Depressariidae. It can be found in Central and Southern Europe, North Africa, Asia and the northeastern part of North America. E. iranella was formerly included here as a subspecies.

The flight time ranges from May to September. The moth is bivoltine, having two generations per year.

The most important host plant is the viper's bugloss, but also Anchusa officinalis and plants from the genus Symphytum. Pupae are attached to dead wood.

External links
 Lepidoptera of Belgium
 Recent sightings on waarneming.nl 

bipunctella
Moths described in 1775
Moths of Europe
Moths of Asia
Moths of Africa
Moths of North America
Taxa named by Johan Christian Fabricius